Demographics of Wales include the numbers in population, place of birth, age, ethnicity, religion, and number of marriages in Wales.

Historical population

The population of Wales doubled from 587,000 in 1801 to 1,163,000 in 1851 and had reached 2,421,000 by 1911.  Most of the increase came in the coal mining districts especially Glamorganshire, which grew from 71,000 in 1801 to 232,000 in 1851 and 1,122,000 in 1911.   Part of this increase can be attributed to the demographic transition seen in most industrialising countries during the Industrial Revolution, as death-rates dropped and birth-rates remained steady. However, there was also a large-scale migration of people into Wales during the industrial revolution.

Current population
The 2021 census showed Wales' population to be 3,107,500, the highest in its history. In 2011, 27 per cent (837,000) of the total population of Wales were not born in Wales, including 636,000 people (21 per cent of the total population of Wales) who were born in England. The main population and industrial areas are in south Wales, including the cities of Cardiff, Swansea and Newport and the nearby valleys, with another significant population in the north-east around Wrexham and Flintshire.According to the 2001 census, 96 per cent of the population was White British, and 2.1 per cent non-white (mainly of British Asian origin). Most non-white groups were concentrated in Cardiff, Newport and Swansea. Welsh Asian and African communities developed mainly through immigration after the Second World War. In the early 21st century, parts of Wales saw an increased number of immigrants settle from recent EU accession countries such as Poland; though a 2007 study showed a relatively low number of employed immigrant workers from the former Eastern Bloc countries in Wales compared to other regions of the United Kingdom.
The 2001 UK census was criticised in Wales for not offering 'Welsh' as an option to describe respondents' national identity. Partly to address this concern, the 2011 census asked the question "How would you describe your national identity?". Respondents were instructed to "tick all that apply" from a list of options that included Welsh. The outcome was that 57.5 per cent of Wales' population indicated their sole national identity to be Welsh; a further 7.1 per cent indicated it to be both Welsh and British. No Welsh national identity was indicated by 34.1 per cent. The proportion giving their sole national identity as British was 16.9 per cent, and another 9.4 per cent included British with another national identity. No British national identity was indicated by 73.7 per cent. 11.2 per cent indicated their sole national identity as English and another 2.6 per cent included English with another national identity.

The 2011 census showed Wales to be less ethnically diverse than any region of 'England and Wales': 93.2 per cent classed themselves as White British (including Welsh, English, Scottish or Northern Irish), 2.4 per cent as "Other White" (including Irish), 2.2 per cent as Asian (including Asian British), 1 per cent as Mixed, and 0.6 per cent as Black (African, Caribbean, or Black British). The lowest proportion of White British (80.3 per cent) was in Cardiff.

In 2001, a quarter of the Welsh population were born outside Wales, mainly in England; about 3 per cent were born outside the UK. The proportion born in Wales varies across the country, with the highest percentages in the south Wales valleys and the lowest in mid Wales and parts of the north-east. In both Blaenau Gwent and Merthyr Tydfil, 92 per cent were Welsh-born, compared with only 51 per cent and 56 per cent in the border counties of Flintshire and Powys. Just over 1.75 million Americans report themselves to have Welsh ancestry, as did 440,965 Canadians in Canada's 2006 census.

The total fertility rate (TFR) in Wales was 1.90 in 2011, which is below the replacement rate of 2.1. The majority of births are to unmarried women (58 per cent of births in 2011 were outside marriage). About one in 10 births (10.7 per cent) in 2011 were to foreign-born mothers, compared to 5.2 per cent in 2001.

Vital statistics

(c) = Census results.

Current vital statistics

Place of birth
According to the 2011 census 2.2 million (73%) of the usual residents were born in Wales, a reduction of two percent since 2001. In 2001, 590,000 (20%) of the population of Wales was born in England. By 2011, the proportion of English-born citizens of Wales had increased by one percent to 21%.  In 2011, 27% (837,000) of the total population of Wales were born outside Wales, and of these immigrants 636,000 (76%) were born in England.

Below are the 5 largest foreign-born groups in Wales according to 2014 ONS estimates.

Age

According to the 2011 census, some 563,000 of the population were aged 65 and over, an increase of 56,700 or one percent since 2001. As in 2001, six per cent (178,000) of the population in Wales were children under five, an increase of 11,300.

Source: 2011 Census: Usual resident population by five-year age group and sex, local authorities in the United Kingdom, Accessed 23 December 2012

National identity

2011 
A question on national identity was asked in the 2011 census: "What do you feel is your national identity?" Respondents could identify themselves as having one or more national identity.

An analysis of the 2011 data by Manchester University's Centre on Dynamics of Ethnicity revealed that:
58% identified as "Welsh only"
16% identified as "British only"
12% identified as "English only"
7% identified as "Welsh and British"

The remainder chose other national identities. (Percentiles are majoritively shown.) The Welsh-Caribbean population were the most likely to respond as "Welsh Only", at 59% of 11,099 citizens.

2018 
A 2018 poll, commissioned by the BBC and carried out by YouGov, found that almost eight in 10 (79%) people in Wales identified strongly as British; while six in 10 (62%) identified strongly as Welsh.

2020 
A 2020 YouGov poll asking a sample of 1110 people "Which, if any, of the following best describes the way you think of yourself?" found the following responses:

 21% "Welsh not British"
 17% "More Welsh than British"
 22% "Equally Welsh and British"
 9% "More British than Welsh"
 17% "British not Welsh"
 11% "Other"
 3% "Don't know"

Summary 
Total Welsh at all: 69%

Total at least more Welsh than British: 38%

Total at least more British than Welsh: 26%

Ethnicity

According to the 2011 census, 2.2 million (73%) of usual residents of Wales were born there, two percent less than in 2001. The change can be attributed to both international and internal migration. In 2001, 590,000 (20%) of the population of Wales was born in England. In 2011, this had increased by one percent. Nearly 418,000 people identified themselves as Welsh in 2001.
The 1991, 2001 and 2011 census estimated the following ethnic groups:

Notes for table above

Source: Census 2001 Key Statistics - Urban area summary results for local authorities KS06 Ethnic group, Retrieved 18 June 2013
Source: Census 2011: Ethnic group, unitary authorities in Wales, Accessed 23 December 2012

Ethnicity of school pupils

Religion
According to the 2011 census, there was a decrease of 14 percentage points in the number of Welsh residents describing themselves as Christian since 2001, when it had been cited by 2.1 million (72%) residents. Christianity experienced a significant decrease in numbers between 2001 and 2011 despite population growth.

The second largest response group for this question in 2011 was those identifying no religion. This increased from 538,000 (19%) of residents in 2001 to 983,000 (32%) in 2011, a larger rise than in any region of England.

Based on pre-census 2011 sources. The largest single Christian denomination of Wales is Calvinist Methodism (Presbyterian Church of Wales), followed by the (Anglican) Church in Wales with 30% of the population, the Roman Catholic Church with 3% and the Congregationalist Union of Welsh Independents with 1% of the population.

Language

The 2011 census collected information about English and Welsh language proficiency. In 2011, 2.9 million (97%) of residents, age three and over, spoke English or Welsh. In a further 18,000 households, at least one adult spoke English or Welsh. In 22,000 households, no resident spoke either language. There were 562,000 (19%) residents, over age three, proficient in at least speaking the Welsh language.  This was a reduction of approximately 2 per cent compared to 2001, though the method of analysis differed between the two censuses. There was also a 2% increase in those, over three years of age, who had no Welsh language skills.
									

Source: 2011 Census: KS207WA Welsh language skills, unitary authorities in Wales, Accessed 23 December 2012

The most common main languages spoken in Wales according to the 2011 census are shown below.

Marriage and civil partnership
In 2011 those who were married were still the largest marriage / civil partnership status group in Wales for residents aged 16 and over though since 2001 this group has decreased by 37,000 (over 5%). In contrast, single people (i.e. those who have never married or been part of a same sex partnership), have increased by 190,000 (6%) in the ten-year period. Civil partnerships, which were given legal status in 2005, appear for the first time in the census results. The number of widows, widowers and surviving partners is 20,000 lower than in 2001. The final groups, relating to separation and divorce / legal dissolution of civil partnerships, have both seen an increase in both numerical and relative terms since 2001.

Table key
 Single = Single never married or registered a same-sex civil partnership)
 Divorced / legally dissolved = divorced or formerly in a same-sex civil partnership which is now legally dissolved	
 Widowed or surviving partner = Widowed or surviving partner from a same-sex civil partnership	
 Separated = Separated (but still legally married or still legally in a same-sex civil partnership)	
 Civil partnership = In a registered same-sex civil partnership

Source: 2011 Census: KS103EW Marital and civil partnership status, unitary authorities in Wales, Accessed 23 December 2012

Military staff and veterans 

Out of the armed services, the Army has the largest presence in Wales, with over 1,400 personnel based there. As of 2019, there were 3,230 military and civilian personnel based in Wales.

In the 2021 census, around 115,000 people in Wales reported that they had previously served in the armed forces, around 4.5% of usual residents in Wales aged 16 years or older.

Miscellaneous data
 Population density (2006): 143 people per square kilometre
 Fertility rate: 1.90 (2007)
 In 2010, 58% of births were outside marriage in Wales. Currently, Wales and Scotland are the only countries of the United Kingdom where the majority of births are outside of marriage (51.3% of births in Scotland in 2012 were outside of marriage). Wales (along with Scotland) also had the highest death rate (10.9 per thousand) in 2005.

See also
Demography of the United Kingdom
Demography of England
Demography of Scotland
Demography of Northern Ireland

References

Demographics of Wales